Líšná is a municipality and village in Přerov District in the Olomouc Region of the Czech Republic. It has about 300 inhabitants.

Etymology
The name is probably derived from líska, i.e. "hazel". According to another theory, it is derived from les, i.e. "forest".

Geography
It lies in the Moravian-Silesian Foothills.

History
The first written mention of Líšná is from 1368. The village was probably founded around 1360.

References

External links

Villages in Přerov District